DECA Inc., formerly Distributive Education Clubs of America, is a 501(c)(3) not-for-profit career and technical student organization (CTSO) with more than 177,000 members in all 50 U.S. states, Washington, DC; Canada, China, Germany, Poland, Guam, Mexico, Puerto Rico and Spain. The United States Congress, the United States Department of Education and state, district and international departments of education authorize DECA's programs.

DECA is organized into two unique student divisions each with programs designed to address the learning styles, interests, and focus of its members. The High School Division includes over 173,000 members in 3,200 schools. The Collegiate Division (formerly Delta Epsilon Chi) includes over 4,000 members in 200+ colleges and universities.

The organization's mission statement is:

DECA prepares emerging leaders and entrepreneurs in marketing, finance, hospitality and management in high schools and colleges around the globe. The four components of the organization's Comprehensive Learning Program are that DECA integrates into classroom instruction, applies learning, connects to business, and promotes competition. DECA prepares the next generation to be academically prepared, community-oriented, professionally responsible, experienced leaders.

Dr. Ed Davis served as executive director from 1992 to 2014. Paul Wardinski served as executive director from 2014 to 2018. Lou DiGiola served as the executive director in 2018. Nicole Rodrigues formerly served as president. Frank Peterson is currently serving as the executive director since 2020. Lori Hairston is currently serving as president.

Governance and partners 

According to DECA's bylaws, the organization is governed by four primary bodies:

Executive Director - The Executive Director is responsible for implementing the board's policies, serving as the fiscal agent and primary spokesperson of the organization, and employing such staff as necessary to plan and execute the board's policies. The Executive Director is Frank Peterson.

Board of Directors - An eleven-member Board of Directors establishes policies relative to the interpretation and implementation of the constitution and bylaws. The current President of the Board of Directors is Scott Jones and the current President-Elect is Steven Mitchell.

National Advisory Board - DECA's National Advisory Board (NAB) is composed of business partners that provide strategic advice for the organizations, professional insight on content and crucial financial support for programming. The current chair of the NAB is Mike Brown from M & M Productions.

Congressional Advisory Board - DECA's Congressional Advisory Board (CAB) is a bipartisan group of United States Senators and Congressmen and women representing varied political philosophies, but all supporting career and technical student organizations as an integral part of delivering career and technical education to ensure that America's youth are college and career ready.

Conferences 

The International Career Development Conference (ICDC) is available to all DECA members. Although only qualifying members may take part in the competitive events series, the conference also offers workshops, academies, and networking for students who wish to further their business skills. DECA ICDC is generally held in April or May of each year and 21,000+ members, advisors, and business professionals attend the conference. The location of the conference rotates between three cities: Anaheim, California; Atlanta, Georgia; and Orlando, Florida.

Competition hierarchy:

 Regional (in some areas, this is known as Area Competition or District Competition)
 State Career Development Conference (SCDC)
 International Career Development Conference (ICDC)

Other conferences include:

 Association Leadership Conferences
 Association Career Development Conferences (CDC)
 AMPED
 Central Region Leadership Conference (CRLC)
 Chartered Association Management Conference (CAM)
 Emerging Leader Summit (ELS; formerly WROTC & SOLT)
 Innovations and Entrepreneurship Conference (IEC)
 New York Experience
 Sports and Entertainment Marketing Conference (SEM)
 The DECA Power Trip
 Train the Trainer Conference
 Western Region Leadership Conference (WRLC)

Competitive events

DECA allows members to participate in ten different types of competitive events:

Principles of Business Administration Events
Team Decision Making Events
Individual Series Events
Personal Finance Literacy Event
Business Operations Research Events
Project Management Events 
Entrepreneurship Events
Marketing Representative Events
Professional Selling and Consulting Events
Online Events

Competitive events fall into six different career clusters:

 Business Management & Administration
 Entrepreneurship
 Marketing
 Finance
 Hospitality & Tourism
 Personal Financial Literacy

Executive officers
DECA's Executive Officer Teams consist of one President and four Vice-Presidents for both the high school and collegiate divisions. A new team of officers is elected every year at the International Career Development Conference by voting delegates from around the globe. The Executive Officer Teams serve as brand ambassadors for the organization during their term by attending conferences where they give speeches and present workshops.

References

External links 
 

Career and technical student organizations
Organizations established in 1946
1946 establishments in the United States
Reston, Virginia
501(c)(3) organizations
Non-profit organizations based in Virginia